The Canoe Sprint men's VL2 event at the 2020 Summer Paralympics took place on 14 and 15 September 2021.

Two heats were held. Winners advanced directly to the final. The rest went into the semi-finals, where the top three in each semi-final advanced to the final.

This was the first event in the Paralympics to feature the Va'a outrigger boat.

Schedule

Results

Heats
Heat 1

Heat 2

Semifinals
Semifinal 1

Semifinal 2

Final A

References

Paracanoeing at the 2020 Summer Paralympics